Hirriusa is a genus of African running crab spiders that was first described by Embrik Strand in 1932.  it contains only three species, found only in South Africa and Namibia: H. arenacea, H. bidentata, and H. variegata.

See also
 List of Philodromidae species

References

Araneomorphae genera
Philodromidae
Spiders of Africa
Taxa named by Embrik Strand